The Utah Soccer Association is the association for soccer and USASA affiliate in Utah. It promotes, oversees, and regulates amateur soccer in the state. It is also affiliated with FIFA, the world governing body of soccer. The Utah Soccer Association has five divisions, the first being the fifth division in U.S. soccer, and the last being the tenth.

Leagues 
Utah Soccer Association administers five divisions of adult amateur soccer that is affiliated with United States Adult Soccer Association. The leagues institute a system of promotion and relegation between them.

 Premiere Division
 First Division
 Second Division
 Third Division
 Fourth Division

See also 
 Utah Youth Soccer Association

References

External links 
 Utah Soccer Association

State Soccer Associations
Soccer in Utah
1978 establishments in Utah
Organizations based in Utah
Sports organizations established in 1978
Organizations based in Salt Lake City